The 2016 US Open was the 136th edition of tennis' US Open, the fourth and final Grand Slam event of the year. It took place on outdoor hard courts at the USTA Billie Jean King National Tennis Center in New York City.

In the men's singles competition, Stan Wawrinka defeated defending champion Novak Djokovic in the final.

Angelique Kerber defeated Karolína Plíšková in the women's singles to become the first German player to win the tournament since Steffi Graf in 1996. 2015 women's singles champion Flavia Pennetta did not defend her title as she had retired at the end of the 2015 season.

This tournament turned out to be the last one in the career of former No.1 player in the world and 2008 French Open women's singles champion Ana Ivanovic, who announced her retirement from professional tennis at the end of the year.

Tournament

The 2016 US Open was the 136th edition of the tournament and it was held at the USTA Billie Jean King National Tennis Center in Flushing Meadows–Corona Park of Queens in New York City, New York, United States.

The tournament was an event run by the International Tennis Federation (ITF) and was part of the 2016 ATP World Tour and the 2016 WTA Tour calendars under the Grand Slam category. The tournament consists of both men's and women's singles and doubles draws as well as a mixed doubles event. There are also singles and doubles events for both boys and girls (players under 18), which is part of the Grade A category of tournaments.

In addition, the annual men's and women's Champions Invitational doubles events were held, with eight male and eight female former Grand Slam champions taking part. For the third year running, the American Collegiate Invitational competitions were organized, where top sixteen American collegiate players compete in men's and women's singles events. Exhibition matches also took place.

Due to the 2016 Summer Paralympics, no usual singles, doubles and quad events for men's and women's wheelchair tennis players as part of the UNIQLO tour under the Grand Slam category were played.

The tournament was played on hard courts and took place on a series of 17 courts with DecoTurf surface, including the three main showcourts – Arthur Ashe Stadium, Louis Armstrong Stadium, and the new Grandstand. It was the first US Open played on courts with operational roofs: on centre court and on the newly built Grandstand stadium. The Ashe roof was expected to be used only for rain, unlike the Australian Open, which also closes its roof in cases of extreme heat. It was also the last tournament before the demolition of Louis Armstrong Stadium and the old Grandstand. Arthur Ashe Stadium and the new Grandstand would be the existing main stadiums for the 2017 edition.

For the second year running, the US Open was scheduled across 14 days, rather than the 15-day schedule of 2013 and 2014, which impacted all senior events. Women's singles semifinals have been scheduled for September 8 evening session, while men's singles semifinal matches was played on Friday September 9. The men's doubles final was played before the women's singles final on Saturday, September 10, and the men's singles final followed the women's doubles final on Sunday, September 11.

Broadcast
In the United States, the 2016 US Open was the second under a new, 11-year, $825 million contract with ESPN, in which the broadcaster holds exclusive rights to the entire tournament and the US Open Series. This means that the tournament was not available on broadcast television. This also makes ESPN the exclusive U.S. broadcaster for three of the four tennis majors.

Live action from a total of twelve courts was available this year (Arthur Ashe Stadium, Louis Armstrong Stadium, Grandstand, Court 4, Court 5, Court 6, Court 9, Court 11, Court 12, Court 13, Court 17 and Court P6/Old Grandstand), an increase from eleven in 2015.

Point and prize money distribution

Point distribution
Below is a series of tables for each of the competitions showing the ranking points on offer for each event.

Senior

Junior

Prize money
The total prize-money compensation for the 2016 US Open is $46.3 million, a 10% increase on the same total last year. Of that total, a record $3.5 million goes to both the men's and women's singles champions. This made the US Open the most lucrative and highest paying tennis grand slam in the world, leapfrogging Wimbledon in total prize money fund. Prize money for the US Open qualifying tournament is also up 10 percent, to $1.9 million.

On top of listed above, $600,000 will contribute Champions Invitational events prize money, while $1,478,000 is estimated as players' per diem. A total of men's and women's singles prize money ($36,324,000) will account for more than 78% of total player compensation, while doubles ($5,463,000) and mixed doubles ($500,000) – for 12% and 1%, respectively.

Bonus prize money
The top three men's and top three women's finishers in the 2016 US Open Series also earn bonus prize money at the US Open, with the champions of the Series Bonus Challenge having the opportunity to win $1 million in addition to their tournament prize money.

Singles players
2016 US Open – Men's singles

2016 US Open – Women's singles

Day-by-day summaries

Before the tournament
5-time champion Roger Federer withdrew from the tournament due to a knee injury.
2009 champion Juan Martín del Potro returned to the tournament for the first time in three years after an intensive injury, receiving a Wild Card entry.
2012 semifinalist Tomáš Berdych withdrew from the tournament due to an appendicitis sustained at the Western & Southern Open.

Day 1
Çağla Büyükakçay became the first Turkish woman to reach the second round in the US Open after defeating Irina Falconi in straight sets.
61st-ranked Zheng Saisai defeated reigning Olympic gold medalist Monica Puig in straight sets. This was the first time that a defending female Olympic gold medalist has lost in the opening round of the US Open.

Day 3
48th-ranked Anastasija Sevastova defeated the 2016 French Open champion and No. 3 seed Garbiñe Muguruza in two sets in the second round. This was the first time since 2011 that the reigning French Open champion lost early in the same tournament.
Kateryna Bondarenko's second round match against World No. 61 Zheng Saisai saw a fan try to jump out and attempt to engage Bondarenko after the match ended. The fan was reported to be a man named Sam Hu, a tennis academy owner originally from Shanghai, China currently living in Long Island, New York, but was arrested.

Day 7
Lucas Pouille defeated 14-time Slam champion Rafael Nadal in five sets, marking the first time since 2004 that Nadal failed to reach the Grand Slam quarterfinal at least in a single season. Pouille advanced to his first US Open quarterfinal.
Sevastova became the first Latvian woman to reach the US Open quarterfinal after she defeated Johanna Konta in the fourth round. She is the first Latvian female quarterfinalist since Larisa Neiland in 1994 Wimbledon Championships.
French veterans Jo-Wilfried Tsonga and Gaël Monfils were advanced to the quarterfinals as well, joined compatriot Pouille at the top half of the men's singles draw, making them the first time three French quarterfinalists at the US Open.

Day 8
Serena Williams won her 308th Grand Slam match record after defeating Yaroslava Shvedova in two sets, surpassing Roger Federer's all-time record in the Open Era.
Ana Konjuh defeated Agnieszka Radwańska in two sets and the first Croatian woman to reach the US Open quarterfinal, this made her best result in Grand Slam.

Day 9
In the men's draw, Novak Djokovic is the only player from the Big Four advanced to the semifinal after Jo-Wilfried Tsonga retired due to his left knee. This meant the first time since 2004 French Open neither Federer, Nadal and Andy Murray moved to the semifinal.

Day 11
Karolína Plíšková defeated six-time champion Serena Williams in two sets to make through on her first Grand Slam final. This was the first time since 2009 which Kim Clijsters defeated both the Williams sisters in the same tournament in which Plíšková defeated Venus Williams in the fourth round.
Angelique Kerber defeated two-time finalist Caroline Wozniacki in two sets to make through on her third Grand Slam final. Kerber claimed the number 1 title following her victory, overtaking Serena Williams' 186-week streak at number 1.

Champions

Seniors

Men's singles

  Stan Wawrinka def.  Novak Djokovic, 6–7(1–7), 6–4, 7–5, 6–3
The two players had met 23 times prior, with Djokovic winning on 19 occasions. This was Wawrinka's first appearance in the final of the tournament. Defending champion Djokovic started well, taking Wawrinka's first service game. Djokovic lost an opportunity to serve out the first set, and the set went into a tie-break. There Wawrinka won the third point but lost another seven, and Djokovic took the first set. In the second set, Wawrinka broke first to lead 3–1. Djokovic broke back and held serve to draw at 4–4, but lost his subsequent serve to allow Wawrinka to take the second set 6–4. Djokovic soon trailed 3–0 at the beginning of the third set but levelled it at 5–5. Wawrinka again broke serve in the final game to take the third set 7–5. Wawrinka started the fourth set like the last two, breaking Djokovic's first service game to lead 3–0. Djokovic received two medical timeouts midway through but was unable to prevent Wawrinka from winning the set 6–3 and his first US Open title.

Women's singles

  Angelique Kerber  def.  Karolína Plíšková, 6–3, 4–6, 6–4
Kerber started the match as favorite to win, having assured the No. 1 women's ranking on 12 September. Plíšková reached her first grand slam final, having never previously made it past the third round, by beating home favorite Serena Williams in the semi-finals. Kerber started strongly, breaking Plíšková's first service game and won the first set 6–3 with another break in serve. Plíšková fought back, breaking midway into the second set to take it into a deciding set. In the third set, Plíšková broke Kerber's second service game to lead, before Kerber levelled the set at 3–3. With the match at 5–4, Plíšková served to stay in the match but Kerber won it in a love game to secure her first US Open title.

Men's doubles

  Jamie Murray /  Bruno Soares def.  Pablo Carreño Busta /  Guillermo García-López, 6–2, 6–3

Women's doubles

  /  Lucie Šafářová def.  Caroline Garcia /  Kristina Mladenovic, 2–6, 7–6(7–5), 6–4

Mixed doubles

   Laura Siegemund /  Mate Pavić def.  Coco Vandeweghe /  Rajeev Ram, 6–4, 6–4

Juniors

Boys' singles

  Félix Auger-Aliassime def.  Miomir Kecmanović, 6–3, 6–0

Girls' singles

  Kayla Day def.  Viktória Kužmová, 6–3, 6–2

Boys' doubles

  Juan Carlos Aguilar /  Felipe Meligeni Alves def.  Félix Auger-Aliassime /  Benjamin Sigouin, 6–3, 7–6(7–4)

Girls' doubles

  Jada Hart /  Ena Shibahara def.  Kayla Day /  Caroline Dolehide, 4–6, 6–2, [13–11]

Invitation

Men's champions doubles

  Pat Cash /  Mark Philippoussis def.  John McEnroe /  Patrick McEnroe, 6–3, 6–4

Women's champions doubles

  Lindsay Davenport /  Mary Joe Fernández def.  Martina Navratilova /  Arantxa Sánchez Vicario, 6–4, 6–2

See also
US Open (tennis)

Notes

References

External links
Official website

 
 

 
 

 
2016 ATP World Tour
2016 in tennis
2016 US Open (tennis)
2016 WTA Tour
2016
August 2016 sports events in the United States
September 2016 sports events in the United States
2016 in American tennis
2016 in sports in New York City